edtFTPnet is an open source FTP client library for Windows  licensed under the LGPL. It was first released in 2003, and was ported from edtFTPj. It is supplied as a DLL and can be incorporated into Windows applications that require FTP functionality. 

edtFTPnet has also been successfully tested for use on Mono, and so can be used on Unix platforms that support Mono.

See also

 Comparison of FTP client software

External links
 Official website
 Creating an FTP Client in .NET 

Free FTP clients
Software that uses Mono (software)
Windows-only free software